The Reckoning is an album by the Israeli band Asaf Avidan & the Mojos, released in Israel in 2008. The album's 15 tracks blended rock, folk and blues with Avidan's lyrics about relationships and betrayal. The album was certified gold status in a year, and platinum later, and would eventually become the biggest selling "independent" record of all time in Israel. It was chosen as Album of the Year (2008) by various media, including Time Out Tel Aviv.

"Reckoning Song" was the first single released from the album in Israel. It would eventually become a huge international hit for Asaf Avidan retitled and remixed as "One Day / Reckoning Song (Wankelmut Rmx)".

"Weak", the second single of the album, became a huge radio hit and its video was "Video of the Year" on Israel's music channel. "Weak" would also be the title song of the film L'Arbre (English title The Tree) by Julie Bertuccelli, which starred Charlotte Gainsbourg and was the closing film at Cannes Film Festival 2010.

Track listing
Telmavar release (2008)
"Maybe You Are" (2:44)
"Hangwoman" (3:02)
"Her Lies" (3:51)
"Weak" (3:33)
"Reckoning Song" (2:46)
"Sweat & Tears" (3:32)
"Rubberband Girl" (2:55)
"A Phoenix Is Born" (1:03)
"Over You Blues" (2:57)
"Empty Handed Saturday Blues" (4:06)
"A Ghost Before the Wall" (3:11)
"Growing Tall" (3:26)
"Little More Time" (5:11)
"Devil's Dance" (3:32)
"Of Scorpions & Bells" (4:34)
"The Devil and Me" [hidden track] (3:06)
Columbia re-release (2012)
16. "One Day / Reckoning Song" (Wankelmut remix) [radio edit] (bonus track) (3:32)

Personnel
All songs written and composed by Asaf Avidan
Arranged by Asaf Avidan & the Mojos and Ori Winokur
Produced by Ori Winokur and Asaf Avidan
Recorded & mixed at Ogen Studio by Yair Nisimov & Sharon Inbar
Mastered at Kevorkian Mastering by Fred Kevorkian

The Mojos
Asaf Avidan – vocals, guitar
Roi Peled – guitar
Ran Nir – bass
Hadas Kleinman – cello
Joni Snow (Yoni Sheleg) – drums

Special guests
Ronit Rolland – piano & accordion on track 15
Tamar Eisenman – Backing vocals on track 6

Other
Album & cover design by Michelle Rolland
All illustrations by Lilach Shmilovitch
Center photo by Omri Barel

Charts

Weekly charts

Weekly charts

References

2008 debut albums
Asaf Avidan albums
Columbia Records albums
Sony BMG albums